Sebastián Puchetta (born March 9, 1986) is an Uruguayan professional footballer.

He played on the professional level in Primera División Uruguaya for Tacuarembó F.C. and Juventud de Las Piedras.

References

1986 births
Living people
Uruguayan footballers
Uruguayan expatriate footballers
Expatriate footballers in Spain
Tacuarembó F.C. players
SD Compostela footballers

Association football midfielders